Eastern sigillata B is a category of Early Roman terra sigillata. Workshops have been identified in Tralles in western Asia Minor.

See also
 Eastern sigillata A (ESA)
 Eastern sigillata C (ESC)
 Eastern sigillata D (ESD)

Ancient Roman pottery